Augustin Charpentier  (1852 – 4 August 1916) was a French physician.

In 1891 he carried out the first experiment providing evidence of the size-weight illusion. He carried out a various number of procedures comparing what people thought was the heaviness of lifted weights. He realized that lifters thought that larger objects were lighter than smaller objects of the same mass.

See also
 Size–weight illusion

External links
 http://www.professeurs-medecine-nancy.fr/Charpentier_A.htm   (in French)

19th-century French physicians
1852 births
1916 deaths